NS8, NS-8, NS.8, NS 8, or, variation, may refer to:

Places
 Marsiling MRT station (station code: NS8), Woodlands, Singapore
 Ichinotorii Station (station code: NS08), Kawanishi, Hyōgo Prefecture, Japan
 Shōnan Station (station code: NS08), Ageo, Saitama, Japan
 Clare-Digby (constituency N.S. 08), Nova Scotia, Canada

Transportation
 Stagecoach Gold bus line NS8
 Blue Origin NS-8, a 2018 April 29 Blue Origin suborbital spaceflight mission for the New Shepard
 RAF N.S. 8, a British NS class airship

Other uses
 RIT1 gene and GTP-binding protein Rit1, also called "NS8"
 Betacoronavirus NS8 protein
 Travan NS8, data backup tape standard
 Netscape Browser (Netscape 8) webbrowser
 New Penguin Shakespeare volume 8

See also

 NS (disambiguation)
 8 (disambiguation)

Disambiguation pages